Lessonia is a genus of South American birds in the tyrant flycatcher family, found near freshwater lakes and saline marshes.

The genus was erected by the English naturalist William Swainson in 1832 with the Austral negrito as the type species. The genus name was chosen to honour the French Navy surgeon and naturalist René Lesson (1794–1849).

Species
The genus contains two species:

References

 
Bird genera